János Patály (born 29 February 1988) is a Hungarian football player who currently plays for Nyíregyháza Spartacus FC.

Club statistics

Updated to games played as of 18 November 2014.

External links
Profile at MLSZ 
Profile at HLSZ 

1988 births
Living people
People from Mátészalka
Hungarian footballers
Association football defenders
Nyíregyháza Spartacus FC players
Nemzeti Bajnokság I players
Sportspeople from Szabolcs-Szatmár-Bereg County